Branxholme Castle is a five-storey tower at Branxholme, about 3 miles south-west of Hawick in the Borders region of Scotland.

History 
The present castle is on land owned by the Clan Scott since 1420. The Earl of Northumberland burned the first castle in 1532. The rebuilt castle held out against the English in the War of the Rough Wooing in 1547. In January 1548 English observers noted that cannon would be needed to capture Branxholme.

In 1570 the Scotts themselves slighted and burnt the castle. On 20 April 1570, an English army under the Earl of Sussex and Lord Hunsdon arrived and Branxholm was described as "a very strong house and well set, and very pleasant gardens and orchards about it." They completed the work of demolition with gunpowder.

In 1571 Sir Walter Scott of Buccleuch commenced rebuilding and his widow Margaret Douglas completed the work in October 1576.  The Scotts were during these troubled years frequently the Wardens of the Middle March.
The castle was extensively remodelled by William Burn in 1837 for the 5th Duke of Buccleuch.
The Branksome Hall School in Toronto, Canada, is named after this castle, and has been given a replica of a mantle from the castle.

Description 
Branxholme castle consists of a sixteenth-century tower house of five storeys, altered and incorporated in a later mansion.  There are vaulted chambers in the basement, and a newel stair.

Poetic references
Walter Scott, 1st Lord Scott of Buccleuch was the “bauld Buccleuch” of the Border ballad Kinmont Willie.
The narrative poem The Lay of the Last Minstrel by the poet and novelist Sir Walter Scott celebrates the success of Baron Henry of Cranston in securing the hand of Lady Margaret of Branksome Hall.

See also
List of places in the Scottish Borders
List of places in Scotland

Bibliography
The Castles of Scotland, Martin Coventry, Goblinshead, 2001
 Scotland’s Castles, Hubert Fenwick, Robert Hale Ltd, 1976

References

Castles in the Scottish Borders
Category B listed buildings in the Scottish Borders
Listed castles in Scotland